One-Way is a 1994 novel by the French writer Didier Van Cauwelaert. It received the Prix Goncourt. It was adapted into the 2001 film Un aller simple, directed by Laurent Heynemann.

See also
 1994 in literature
 Contemporary French literature

References

1994 French novels
Novels about orphans
Prix Goncourt winning works
French novels adapted into films
Éditions Albin Michel books